The AC NM AE T1 (Mina Anti-Carro Não-Magnética Auto Explosiva modelo T1) is a Brazilian minimum metal anti-tank blast mine. The mine is believed to be in service with the Brazilian army, although production of the mine ceased in 1989. The mine has a square plastic main body, with a raised circular pressure plate and fuze. A carry handle is built into one side of the mine. It appears to be very similar to the PRB M3.

The mine is reportedly used in Ecuador, Peru and Libya.

Specifications
 Length: 225 mm
 Width: 255 mm
 Height: 155 mm
 Weight: 8 kg
 Explosive content: 7 kg of TNT with a Pentolite booster (a 50:50 PETN/TNT mix)
 Operating pressure: 60 to 140 kg

References

 Jane's Mines and Mine Clearance 2005-2006
 

Anti-tank mines
Land mines of Brazil